K71 or K-71 may refer to:

K-71 (Kansas highway), a state highway in Kansas
INS Vijaydurg (K71), an Indian Navy ship